Cymbidium erectum may refer to:

Cymbidium erectum (Thunb.) Sw. 1799, a synonym of  Cephalanthera erecta, an orchid species
Cymbidium erectum Wight 1851, a synonym of Cymbidium aloifolium, an orchid species